Estadio Atenas is a multi-use stadium in San Carlos, Maldonado in Uruguay.  It is currently used primarily for football matches and hosts the home matches of Atenas de San Carlos of the Primera División Uruguaya.  The stadium holds 6,000 spectators.

External links
Stadium information

Atenas
Atenas
San Carlos, Uruguay
Sport in Maldonado Department